Disclosure may refer to:

Arts and media 
Disclosure (The Gathering album), 2012
Disclosure (band), a UK-based garage/electronic duo
Disclosure (novel), 1994 novel written by Michael Crichton
Disclosure (1994 film), an American erotic thriller film starring Michael Douglas and Demi Moore, based on the novel
Disclosure: Trans Lives on Screen, an American documentary film about Hollywood depiction of transgender people
"Disclosure" (Stargate SG-1), an episode of Stargate SG-1
CBC News: Disclosure, a television newsmagazine series in Canada

Law and finance
Disclosure of evidence or Discovery, pre-trial phase in lawsuits where parties to the case obtain evidence
Convention of disclosure, convention that all material facts must be disclosed in financial statements
Key disclosure law, legislation that requires individuals to surrender cryptographic keys to law enforcement
Prospectus (finance), a disclosure document that describes a financial security

Other uses 
Disclosure (ufology), conspiracy theory that the United States government or other world governments have suppressed evidence of extraterrestrial life
Disclosure widget, GUI element that is used to show or hide various child elements in the interface
World disclosure, the way that things become intelligible and meaningfully relevant to human beings
Reflective disclosure, a model of social criticism proposed by philosopher Nikolas Kompridis

See also
Disclose (disambiguation)
Full disclosure (disambiguation)

Disclosure and Barring Service, a body of the Home Office of the United Kingdom  providing criminal records disclosure services in England and Wales
Disclosure Scotland, an executive agency of the Scottish Government providing criminal records disclosure services
 Conflict of interest, a situation in which a person or organization is involved in multiple interests, which may require disclosure